Olmitz is a city in Barton County, Kansas, United States.  As of the 2020 census, the population of the city was 90.

History
Olmitz was laid out in 1885. It was named after the city of Olomouc (German: Olmütz), in Austria-Hungary (today in the Czech Republic). Olmitz was originally built up chiefly by Austrians.

Geography
Olmitz is located at  (38.516460, -98.937386).

Demographics

2010 census
As of the census of 2010, there were 114 people, 54 households, and 33 families living in the city. The racial makeup of the city was 99.1% White and 0.9% from two or more races. Hispanic or Latino of any race were 0.9% of the population.

There were 54 households, of which 25.9% had children under the age of 18 living with them, 48.1% were married couples living together, 7.4% had a female householder with no husband present, 5.6% had a male householder with no wife present, and 38.9% were non-families. 33.3% of all households were made up of individuals, and 24.1% had someone living alone who was 65 years of age or older. The average household size was 2.11 and the average family size was 2.64.

The median age in the city was 44 years. 19.3% of residents were under the age of 18; 10.5% were between the ages of 18 and 24; 22% were from 25 to 44; 23.7% were from 45 to 64; and 24.6% were 65 years of age or older. The gender makeup of the city was 50.0% male and 50.0% female.

2000 census
As of the census of 2000, there were 138 people, 62 households, and 37 families living in the city. The racial makeup of the city was 96.38% White, and 3.62% from two or more races. Hispanic or Latino of any race were 1.45% of the population.

There were 62 households, out of which 32.3% had children under the age of 18 living with them, 46.8% were married couples living together, 8.1% had a female householder with no husband present, and 40.3% were non-families. 37.1% of all households were made up of individuals, and 17.7% had someone living alone who was 65 years of age or older. The average household size was 2.23 and the average family size was 3.00.

In the city, the population was spread out, with 27.5% under the age of 18, 8.0% from 18 to 24, 27.5% from 25 to 44, 21.0% from 45 to 64, and 15.9% who were 65 years of age or older. The median age was 37 years. For every 100 females, there were 97.1 males. For every 100 females age 18 and over, there were 104.1 males.

The median income for a household in the city was $31,429, and the median income for a family was $34,500. Males had a median income of $25,500 versus $13,333 for females. The per capita income for the city was $12,998. There were 11.9% of families and 12.9% of the population living below the poverty line, including 14.6% of under eighteens and 7.4% of those over 64.

References

Further reading

External links
 Olmitz - Directory of Public Officials
 USD 431, local school district
 Olmitz city map, KDOT

Cities in Kansas
Cities in Barton County, Kansas